Dersingham was a railway station on the King's Lynn to Hunstanton line which served the village of Dersingham, a few miles north of King's Lynn in North Norfolk, England.

History 
The station was opened on 3 October 1862 by the Lynn and Hunstanton Railway.

The station was host to a LNER camping coach from 1935 to 1939 and may have had a coach visiting in 1934.

The station closed along with the line on 5 May 1969.

At 8 miles 17 chains (13.22 km) from King's Lynn, Dersingham marked the half-way point of the Hunstanton line. It was situated in possibly the most attractive section of the route where the line ran through extensive woodlands, between pine trees and rhododendrons, with the sea visible on the left.

Architecturally, the station resembles North Wootton station, with a small main station building on the up platform and a small waiting room provided on the down platform; both had Great Eastern–style canopies. A small goods yard adjoined the main station building, and a standard Great Eastern gabled signal box was sited on the southern end of the down platform. A level crossing lay at the northern end of the station and, in common with other stations on the line, convenient lodging accommodation, a solidly built Carstone inn known as "The Alexandra Hotel", was to be found opposite the station approach.

Present day 
The station buildings, including canopies, signal box and both platforms, have largely survived the station's closure in 1969. The platform and outbuildings are in use as offices and stores for Semba Trading, a builder's merchant, while the main station building has been converted into a private residence.

References 

Disused railway stations in Norfolk
Former Great Eastern Railway stations
Railway stations in Great Britain opened in 1862
Railway stations in Great Britain closed in 1969
1862 establishments in England
Dersingham